Cumberland Trail may refer to:

 Cumberland Trail, which went through Cumberland Gap and is now part of the Justin P. Wilson Cumberland Trail State Park in Tennessee
 Cumberland Road, also called Cumberland Trail, that is now part of the National Road